This is a list of Australian films from 2010 to present. For a complete alphabetical list, see :Category:Australian films.

2010
List of Australian films of 2010

2011
List of Australian films of 2011

2012
List of Australian films of 2012

2013
List of Australian films of 2013

2014
List of Australian films of 2014

2015
List of Australian films of 2015

2016
List of Australian films of 2016

2017
List of Australian films of 2017

2018
List of Australian films of 2018

2019
List of Australian films of 2019

2010s
Australian
 Films